The Battle of Dong-Yin was a naval conflict between forces of the Republic of China Navy and the People's Liberation Army Navy around Dongyin island, Fukien Province, Republic of China on 1 May 1965. Both sides subsequently claimed victory.

Overview 
Around 12:40 AM on May 1, 1965, a ROCN Northern Division Dong-jiang a PC (patrol craft) on patrol northeast of Dong-Yin Island encountered a PLAN force consisting of 8 fast attack gunboats. The PLAN combatants attempted to encircle the ROCN destroyer, and the two sides exchanged fire from a distance of 500 to 1,000 yards. In the ensuing exchange, 4 PLAN gunboats were sunk, and 2 damaged.

References

External links 
 The naval engagement of DongYin on May 1 

Matsu Islands
Dongyin Islands 1965
Dong-Yin
Dong-Yin
1965 in China
Cross-Strait conflict
May 1965 events in Asia
Dong-Yin